Sybra acuta is a species of beetle in the family Cerambycidae. It was described by Pascoe in 1863. It is known from Australia.

References

acuta
Beetles described in 1863